The New Orleans Pelicans are an American professional basketball team based in New Orleans, Louisiana. They play in the Southwest Division of the Western Conference of the National Basketball Association (NBA). The Pelicans were established as the New Orleans Hornets in the  when then-owner of the Charlotte Hornets, George Shinn, relocated the franchise to New Orleans. During the 2005–07 period, the Hornets played 71 games in Oklahoma City due to the damage caused by Hurricane Katrina.  The team officially changed its name to the New Orleans Pelicans on April 18, 2013.

Key

Selections

Footnotes

 On July 12, 2006, the Hornets traded the draft rights to Andrew Betts to the Indiana Pacers for Peja Stojaković and cash considerations.
 On October 26, 2005, the Hornets traded Jamaal Magloire to the Milwaukee Bucks for Desmond Mason, a 2006 first-round pick (#15 overall pick), and cash considerations.
 On June 27, 2008, the Hornets traded the draft rights to Darrell Arthur to Portland Trail Blazers for cash considerations.

References
General
 

Specific

 
National Basketball Association draft
Draft